Kolgi Kesh (also Romanized as Kolgī Kesh) is a village in Irafshan Rural District, Ashar District, Mehrestan County, Sistan and Baluchestan Province, Iran. At the 2006 census, its population was 151, in 29 families.

References 

Populated places in Mehrestan County